ARM Sonora (PO-152) is a  in service with the Mexican Navy with a  main gun turret and a helicopter landing pad, primarily used for illicit drug interdiction. Like other ships of this class, it was designed and built in Mexican dockyards. The vessel was launched and commissioned on 4 September 2000 and is in active service.

Description
The Durango-class design is based on the s but with a different superstructure. For electrical power, the Durango class are equipped with two 260 kilowatt generators and one 190 kW generator.

The ships mount an Alenia 2 combat data system and Saab EOS 450 optronic director for fire control. They are equipped with air and surface search radar. The Durango class has a complement of 74 including 10 officers with the capability to transport 55 additional personnel. The vessels also mount a helicopter deck over the stern and a hangar and are capable of operating one medium helicopter.

Construction and career
The ship was laid down at ASTIMAR 20 shipyard in Salina Cruz, Oaxaca on 14 December 1999. Sonora was launched and commissioned into the Mexican Navy on 4 September 2000. In 2014, Sonora was among the Mexican units dispatched to Peru for the multi-national military exercise UNITAS. In 2018, Sonora was authorized to train with foreign navies. In July, the patrol vessel trained with the United States Navy at San Diego, California. In 2020, a member of Sonoras crew tested positive for COVID-19. The crew member was sent home while the rest of the crew, who showed no signs, remained isolated aboard their ship.

Notes

Citations

Sources
 
 
 

Durango-class patrol vessels
Ships built in Mexico
2000 ships